Alexsandr Derevyagin (born March 24, 1979) is a Russian hurdler.

He finished 8th in the 400m hurdles final at the 2006 European Athletics Championships in Gothenburg.

He also competed in the 4 × 400 m relay team for Russia at the 2006 IAAF World Indoor Championships, winning a bronze medal.

Competition record

References

1979 births
Living people
Russian male hurdlers
Russian male sprinters
Olympic athletes of Russia
Athletes (track and field) at the 2008 Summer Olympics
Competitors at the 2003 Summer Universiade
Competitors at the 2005 Summer Universiade
World Athletics Championships athletes for Russia
World Athletics Indoor Championships medalists
Russian Athletics Championships winners